Inside Story is an album by saxophonist Prince Lasha which was recorded in 1965 but not released on the Enja label until 1981.  The compact disc (Enja CD 9131-2) appends the album Search for Tomorrow, a 1974 live album recorded at the Berkeley Jazz Festival, and previously released as Live At Berkeley Jazz Festival Vol. 2 (Birdseye 99001).

Reception 

The Allmusic review by Scott Yanow stated: "this obscure set features flutist Prince Lasha in prime form. ...The inside/outside music has its free moments and solidifies the leader's position as one of the best flutists in the avant-garde movement of the period".

Track listing 
All compositions by Prince Lasha
 "Ethereal" - 7:13
 "Flight" - 7:15
 "Kwadwo Safari" - 7:36
 "Inside Story" - 8:04
 "Mary" - 9:31

The CD configuration appends three tracks from Search for Tomorrow:

Personnel

Inside Story 
Prince Lasha - alto saxophone, flute
Herbie Hancock - piano
Cecil McBee  - bass
 Jimmy Lovelace - drums

Search for Tomorrow 
Prince Lasha - alto saxophone, flute, baritone saxophone
Hubert Eaves - piano
Ron Carter - bass
Roy McCurdy - drums
Kenneth Nash - percussion

References 

Prince Lasha albums
1981 albums
Enja Records albums